Steven John Norris (born 24 May 1945 in Liverpool) is a British Conservative Party politician and businessman. Norris served as Member of Parliament for Oxford East from 1983 to 1987. After narrowly losing that marginal seat in 1987 he re-entered the House of Commons at a by-election for Epping Forest in 1988, which he held until stepping down to focus on his business career in 1997. He was subsequently chosen by Conservative Party members to be the Conservative candidate for Mayor of London in 2000 and 2004 in which he secured 42% and 45% respectively, coming second to Ken Livingstone but ahead of the Conservative Party's vote share for the Greater London Assembly.

Early life and career
Norris attended the Liverpool Institute for Boys, a grammar school, from 1956 to 1963 where he was Head Boy. He earned an open Exhibition in Social Studies and graduated from Worcester College, Oxford, where he was President of the University Law Society. After graduating, he pursued a career in the engineering and motor industries and entered politics upon election to Berkshire County Council in 1977, where he became Deputy Leader.

Parliamentary and ministerial career 
In 13 years as Member of Parliament, Norris was appointed Parliamentary Private Secretary to William Waldegrave, at the Department of the Environment; to Nicholas Ridley at the Department of Trade and Industry; and to Kenneth Baker at the Home Office. He was then promoted to Minister for Transport in London by John Major in 1992, where he was responsible for the Jubilee line Extension, the largest extension of the London Underground network to date.

Public transport roles 
Norris’ expertise on public transport issues led him to roles as Chairman of the National Cycling Strategy Board, Director General of the Road Haulage Association and President of the Motor Cycle Industry Association, and a Commissioner with the Independent Transport Commission. He also served as patron of the cyclists charity, Sustrans, and of the Campaign for Better Transport (UK) Trust.

Equality issues 
Norris was a pioneer for equality for gays and lesbians before the law as a Member of Parliament and later as a Mayoral candidate. In particular, Norris took the step of writing to the Conservative Party Chairman Chris Patten to suggest that the party include an equal age of consent in its next election manifesto. This change in the law was eventually achieved in 2001 under the Blair government.

Additionally, Norris registered the Conservative Parliamentary Group for Homosexual Law Reform with the party's whips office and the 1922 Committee. Realising that the party would not make a manifesto commitment to age of consent equality, the group decided to lobby individual ministers and departments with an agenda for change. This included a review of the 1967 Sexual Offences Act to allow for an equal age of consent, as well as allowing gays and lesbians to serve openly in the armed forces; supporting a more liberal prosecution policy in Scotland; enforcement of existing Home Office advice against police entrapment and a more positive image for the Conservative Party on equality issues. Norris also was one of a handful of prominent Tories who lobbied against the discriminatory Section 28, ostensibly intended by its supporters to outlaw the teaching of homosexuality in schools, later was repealed by the Blair government and renounced by the Conservative Party under David Cameron. At the time of repeal, Norris opposed then leader William Hague’s support of the measure.

London Mayoral bids

2000
In September 1999, Norris contested Jeffrey Archer for the Conservative Party nomination for Mayor of London. Archer was initially selected as the candidate by party members, but was forced to withdraw later that year after it was revealed that he had committed perjury in a libel case. Archer was subsequently convicted of the crime and imprisoned. Norris was then selected as the Conservative Party candidate in a ballot of members in December of that year, going on to earn 42% of the vote against duly-elected London Mayor Ken Livingstone.

2004
In November 2002, Norris formally announced his intention to run again for the London mayoralty. In February 2003, he was again selected as the party’s candidate in a ballot of London party members. His platform included plans for after-hours London Underground services and an approach to crime based on the ‘broken windows’ theory that had been championed by New York City Mayor Rudy Giuliani. Norris had met Giuliani during the campaign, and proposed an agreement with Giuliani Partners to advise him as mayor, should Norris be successful.

2008
Following speculation that he might run again for the mayoralty in 2008, and the extension of the party's deadline for nominations in the hope of attracting a heavyweight candidate, Norris said in an interview that "If I run, I'll win", but ultimately chose not to apply. Subsequently, Boris Johnson became the party's candidate.

Business career
Norris is a board member of a number of companies and a strategic advisor to several others in the fields of transport, infrastructure and property. He is one of Property Weeks Property Power 100 and is chairman of Soho Estates, which controls around 60 acres of London's Soho district. He is also chairman of London Resort Company Holdings, developers of the £3.5 billion entertainment resort project in Kent. He was Independent Non-Executive Chairman of This Land Limited, Cambridgeshire County Council's arms- length property company from 2019 – 2022. He is Chairman of Future-Built Limited, a construction company, and of EVO.PM, a proptech maintenance company. He is also a partner with Craig Calder in Sanctuary Investments Limited.

In the infrastructure sector, he is chair of the Council of the National Infrastructure Planning Association and chairman of Driver Group plc. In the field of transportation, he was a member of the board of Transport for London under Mayor Boris Johnson. He is deputy chairman of bus manufacturer Optare. He was a main board member of Cubic Corporation of San Diego, California, a defence and transportation technology specialist, serving from 2014 until 2021, when the company was sold to Elliott and Veritas Capital. He remains an advisor to the UK business. He is Chairman of Evtec Automotive Limited, a Tier 1 supplier principally to Jaguar Landrover. He was appointed chairman of Jarvis in 2003.

Current voluntary roles 
Norris is a former Chairman of the Prince Michael International Road Safety Awards, currently a vice-president of both the Royal National Institute for the Deaf and the Institute of Advanced Motorists a Patron of The Urology Foundation and Chairman of the Surrey Canal Sports Foundation. He is an Eminent Fellow of the Royal Institution of Chartered Surveyors, Fellow of the Chartered Institute of Logistics and Transport, Fellow of the Chartered Institute of Highways and Transportation, a Fellow of the Institution of Civil Engineers and an Honorary Fellow of the Association for Project Management. He holds an Honorary Doctorate of Laws from the University of East London.

References

1945 births
Living people
Conservative Party (UK) MPs for English constituencies
Alumni of Worcester College, Oxford
UK MPs 1983–1987
UK MPs 1987–1992
UK MPs 1992–1997
Politicians from Liverpool
People educated at Liverpool Institute High School for Boys
Members of Berkshire County Council